PSNA College of Engineering & Technology (PSNA CET) is an Autonomous Engineering College situated in Kothandaraman Nagar, Dindigul, in the Indian state of Tamil Nadu. It is affiliated to Anna University and approved by the All India Council for Technical Education of New Delhi. It is accredited with the rating of A++ by NAAC with CGPA of 3.65.

History
The College was founded in 1984 by the late Thiru R.S. Kothandaraman. The college functions under the aegis of Sri Rangalatchumi Educational Trust and is approved by the All India Council for Technical Education.

Location
It is spread over 45 hectares.

Programmes offered

U.G. degree programmes
 Mechanical Engineering
 Information Technology
 Civil Engineering
 Computer science and Engineering
 Electronics & Communication Engineering
 Electrical & Electronics Engineering
 Bio-Medical Engineering
 Artificial intelligence and data science
 Computer science and business system

B.E. and prince. (3 years)
 Diploma Holders can join directly in the second year

P.G. degree programmes
 M.E. Computer Science & Engineering (2 years)
 M.E. Power Electronics & Drives (2 years)
 M.E. Computer & Communication (2 years)
 M.E. Applied Electronics (2 years)
 M.E. (VLSI Design) (2 years)
 M.E. Structural Engineering (2 years)
 M.E. Engineering Design (2 years)
 M.B.A. (2 years)
 M.C.A. (3 years)
Following programs are accredited by NAC, AICTE.
 Mechanical Engineering (UG)
 Electronics & Communication Engineering (UG)
 Electrical & Electronics Engineering (UG)
 Computer science and Engineering (UG)
 Civil Engineering (UG)
 M.B.A (PG)

Awards
PSNA received the Bharatiya Vidya Bhavan - National Award (2007) from the Indian Society for Technical Education (ISTE) for best overall performance. This is jointly awarded to this college and P.S.G. College of Technology Coimbatore

References

External links

Engineering colleges in Tamil Nadu
Educational institutions established in 1984
Education in Dindigul district
All India Council for Technical Education
1984 establishments in Tamil Nadu